Now You Know is the debut solo album by American musician Doug Martsch of indie rock band Built to Spill. Unlike Martsch's rock-oriented work with Built to Spill, the album touches on blues and folk in addition to rock. Now You Know was released in 2002 on Up Records label.

Track listing 
All tracks composed by Doug Martsch; except where noted. Karena Youtz contributed lyrics.
 "Offer"
 "Dream"
 "Gone"
 "Window"
 "Heart (Things Never Shared)"
 "Lift"
 "Woke Up This Morning (With My Mind on Jesus)" (Fred McDowell) uncredited
 "Instrumental"
 "Sleeve"
 "Impossible"
 "Stay"

Personnel
Doug Martsch - vocals, all other instruments
Travis Ward - bass
Daren Adair - drums
John McMahon - cello

Critical reception

Pitchfork Media says the album has 
"a Delta blues sound-- a style closer to the point in musical evolution where country/western and blues went their separate, segregated ways" and also called it "Blooze for Dummies."  The reviewer also noted that most of the songs begin "with bluesy intentions, but only a handful (... "Offer"... and... "Stay") stick with that dynamic for their duration."  The reviewer seemed mostly not to enjoy the departure from the Built to Spill sound, remarking that "the more familiar-sounding material is what really sticks amongst these eleven tracks."

Rolling Stone calls the album  "bare-bones folk blues that recalls O Brother, Where Art Thou? more than anything by... Built to Spill."  The reviewer sees the album as being influenced by "such Delta bluesmen as Fred McDowell" as well as by "Ralph Stanley and J Mascis."

References

Now You Know
Doug Martsch albums